Victor Clothing Company was a retail clothing store at 242 S. Broadway, Downtown Los Angeles. Originally from 1926–1964 it was located at the Crocker Building #212–6 S. Broadway. 

The store reached its heyday in the 1940s and '50s when Broadway was the city's main retail and commercial street and "The Victor" employed more than 50 workers and stocked thousands of men's suits and some furs and dresses for women. In its last decades it was a frequent advertiser on local Spanish-language television. The store closed in 2001, according to the owner due to shrinking customer traffic in the area.

Victor Clothing Company murals 
Three historic public art murals dating from 1984-1985 were painted on the exterior walls of the former Victor Clothing Company buildings between Broadway Street and Spring Street, Los Angeles.

 Anthony Quinn or The Pope of Broadway (1984) by Eloy Torrez
 El Nuevo Fuego (1985) by East Los Streetscapers
 The Bride and Groom (1985) by Kent Twitchell

References

Clothing retailers of the United States
Defunct companies based in California
Companies based in Los Angeles
Murals in Los Angeles
Broadway (Los Angeles)